Stuart Crawford, (born 13 February 1981) is a professional squash player who has represented Scotland. He reached a career-high world ranking of World No. 113 in February 2008.

Crawford was born in Irvine.

References

External links 
 
 

1981 births
Living people
Scottish male squash players